Jean-Jacques Pignard (born April 1947 in Villefranche-sur-Saône, Rhône) is a French politician and a member of the Senate of France. He represents the Rhône department and is a member of the New Centre. He replaces Michel Mercier, who resigned his Senate seat to join cabinet. He was previously mayor of Villefranche.

References

1947 births
Living people
People from Villefranche-sur-Saône
Union for French Democracy politicians
The Centrists politicians
Centrist Alliance politicians
French Senators of the Fifth Republic
Union of Democrats and Independents politicians
Senators of Rhône (department)